The Malagasy palm swift (Cypsiurus gracilis) is a small swift in the family Apodidae. It is very similar to the African palm swift, Cypsiurus parvus, with which it was formerly considered conspecific. It was split based on differences in vocalizations and plumage coloration.

Distribution
The  Malagasy palm swift is native to Madagascar and Comoros.

References

Cypsiurus
Birds of Africa
Birds described in 1871
Taxa named by Richard Bowdler Sharpe